WWF Superstars is a video game released on the Game Boy handheld console by Acclaim Entertainment, based on the WWF's syndicated television show of the same name. This game was the first WWF/E game for the Game Boy system.

The game was succeeded by WWF Superstars 2, which was released in 1992 by Acclaim Entertainment. A unique engine was built from the ground up; the developers never attempted to emulate the gaming engine found in the more advanced WWF games.

Overview
WWF Superstars was developed by Rare and published by LJN. It was released in Europe and North America in 1991, which was followed by its Japanese release on February 14, 1992.

Before every match, wrestlers cut promos on their opponent. Following the match, Vince McMahon comments on the action. The wrestlers each have two comments. One is a generic taunt, while the second is specific to the opponent.

The game features five wrestlers: Hulk Hogan, "Macho Man" Randy Savage, The Ultimate Warrior, "The Million Dollar Man" Ted DiBiase, and Mr. Perfect.

Nintendo Power reviewed WWF Superstars in their April 1991 issue and rated it a score of 2.9 out of 5.

Gameplay
All wrestlers have the same moves, with the exception of individualized strike attacks. The moveset consists of attack moves (punch and kick), a bodyslam, grappling moves that can only be performed when you pick your opponent up from the mat (piledriver, suplex, headlock with punches), ground attack moves (elbow or knee drop), Irish whip moves (clothesline and dropkick), and flying turnbuckle moves (elbow or knee drop). Players can also wrestle outside the ring by throwing their opponent over the ropes or by performing a dropkick through the ropes. Throwing the opponent out of the ring can be done once per match and causes considerable damage.

Once a player selects a wrestler, they must defeat the other four in a series of matches to be named WWF World Heavyweight Champion. On completion, the player gets a portrait picture of their chosen superstar.

References

1991 video games
Acclaim Entertainment games
Game Boy games
Game Boy-only games
LJN games
Rare (company) games
WWE video games
Multiplayer and single-player video games
Video games scored by David Wise
Professional wrestling games
Video games developed in the United Kingdom